The siege of the Sherpur Cantonment was a battle fought in December 1879, during the Second Anglo-Afghan War.

Background 
On 3 September 1879 Sir Pierre Cavagnari, the British Resident in Kabul, and his escort were massacred by mutinous Afghan troops, initiating the second phase of the Second Anglo-Afghan War. A force was assembled and named the Kabul Field Force, under the command of Major-General Frederick Roberts. After defeating Afghan forces at Chariasab on 6 October, Roberts marched into Kabul on 13 October. With Kabul itself vulnerable to attack, Roberts based his force in the unfinished Sherpur cantonment, a mile north of the city. A military commission was then set up to try those responsible for Cavagnari's death. While a strong response to the murders was considered necessary, the resultant public executions helped unite Afghan opposition against the British presence.

At the end of November, an army of tribesmen under the command of Mohammed Jan Khan Wardak, who had denounced Amir Mohammad Yaqub Khan as a British puppet and instead declared Musa Jan the new amir, gathered in the area north of Kabul. On 11 December a small detachment (c.170 men) of the 9th Queen's Royal Lancers and the 14th Bengal Lancers encountered a 10,000+ Afghan army advancing on Kabul. In an attempt to delay the advance, the outnumbered Lancers charged the Afghans. Heavy casualties were suffered and the Afghans continued their advance. Anglican chaplain James Adams was awarded the Victoria Cross for rescuing the wounded.

The siege 
On 15 December, the Afghan army began to besiege the British forces entrenched in the Sherpur Cantonment. As news of a relief column under the command of Brigadier General Charles Gough reached Mohammed Jan, he ordered his troops to storm the cantonment on 23 December. By midday, the assault had been repulsed, and the Afghan army dispersed. No quarter was given to Afghans found in the area with weapons.

The Sherpur Cantonment is maintained up to the present as a British military cemetery.

Order of battle

British regiments
 9th Lancers
 67th Foot
 72nd Highlanders
 92nd Highlanders

British Indian Army regiments
 12th Cavalry
 14th Murray’s Lancers
 Queen’s Own Corps of Guides
 5th Cavalry, Punjab Frontier Force
 1st PWO Sappers and Miners
 23rd Bengal Native Infantry (Pioneers)
 28th Bengal Native Infantry (Punjabis)
 3rd Sikh Infantry
 5th Punjabis (Vaughan’s Rifles)
 2nd Gurkha Rifles
 4th Gurkha Rifles
 5th Gurkha Rifles
 22nd (Derajat) Mountain Battery (Frontier Force)
 24th (Hazara) Mountain Battery (Frontier Force)

Gallery

References

Sherpur Cantonment
1879 in Afghanistan
Sherpur Cantonment
Sherpur Cantonment
Sherpur Cantonment
History of Kabul
19th century in Kabul
Sherpur Cantonment
December 1879 events